The canton of Pays de Morlaàs et du Montanérès is an administrative division of the Pyrénées-Atlantiques department, southwestern France. It was created at the French canton reorganisation which came into effect in March 2015. Its seat is in Morlaàs.

It consists of the following communes:
 
Abère
Andoins
Anos
Arrien
Artigueloutan
Baleix
Barinque
Bédeille
Bentayou-Sérée
Bernadets
Buros
Casteide-Doat
Castéra-Loubix
Escoubès
Eslourenties-Daban
Espéchède
Gabaston
Higuères-Souye
Labatut-Figuières
Lamayou
Lée
Lespourcy
Lombia
Maucor
Maure
Momy
Monségur
Montaner
Morlaàs
Ouillon
Ousse
Ponson-Debat-Pouts
Pontiacq-Viellepinte
Riupeyrous
Saint-Armou
Saint-Castin
Saint-Jammes
Saint-Laurent-Bretagne
Saubole
Sedze-Maubecq
Sedzère
Sendets
Serres-Morlaàs
Urost

References

Cantons of Pyrénées-Atlantiques